Tecno Spark 4 Lite, Tecno Spark 4 Air and Tecno Spark 4 are Android-based smartphones manufactured, released and marketed by Tecno Mobile as part of Tecno Spark 4 series. The device were unveiled as successors to Tecno Spark 3 and Tecno Spark 3 Pro. It is the fourth generation of Tecno's Spark series of smartphones.

The Spark 4 Lite, Spark 4 Air and Spark 4 is an upgraded version of Spark 3 batch, coming with the same OS, RAM and GPU, but with different UI and battery capacity.

The phone has received generally favorable reviews, with critics mostly noting the larger battery, larger display, triple cameras and the faiba support. Critics, however, still criticize the lack of full HD display, software update, fast charging and missing USB Type-C port.

Specifications

Hardware
The Spark 4 Lite, Spark 4 Air and Spark 4 all feature a 720p resolution. The Spark 4 Lite and Spark 4 come with an 20:9 aspect ratio, the Spark 4 Air comes with an 19.5:9 aspect ratio; the Spark 4 Lite and Spark 4 has 6.52-inch Dot Notch IPS LCD display, the Spark 4 Air has 6.1-inch Dot Notch IPS LCD display. The Spark 4 comes with Always On display and HDR10.

All the devices come with a MediaTek Helio A22 SoC and 2 GB of RAM.

The Spark 4 Lite, Spark 4 Air and Spark 4 all come with 32 GB storage. They all feature the ability to use a microSD card to expand the storage to a maximum of 128 GB.

The Spark 4 Lite and Spark 4  come with the battery capacities of 4000 mAh, while the Spark 4 Air comes with the battery capacity of 3000 mAh.

The Spark 4 series features an improved camera and improved display. The Spark 4 comes with three lenses, a 13 MP shooter, a 2 MP shooter and a VGA lens.

Software
All the devices ship with Android 9.0 "Pie" with a new HiOS 5.5, different from the versions found on Spark 3 and Spark 3 Pro.

The HiOS 5.5 comes with an AR virtual canvas, gesture call picker, game mode, game assistant, closed eye detection and fingerprint reset password.

Reception 
Dickson Otieno from Tech-ish gave the Spark 4 a score of 3.6/5, praising the design, but stated that it's boring, copying the same design every time. However, he noted that the battery is a good upgrade from Spark 3 Pro.

George Kamau from Techweez noted that Spark 4 looks good as a budget phone, but concluded that the device fails in the competitive budget smartphones market.

Usama Anjum from Phone World praised the Spark 4 design and the triple rear camera. He opined that the features is okay for a budget smartphone.

Anfernee Onamu from Gadgets Africa praised Spark 4 for its screen, battery life and fun features, but opined that the device has a low-quality camera.

Nixon Kanali from Tech Trends KE praised the overall design of Spark 4, stating that it's easy to use and handle. He went further to praise the device support for Faiba and its battery performance.

Kevin Kimani from Mobi Trends praised the Spark 4 for its display, camera and battery, but noted that the charging speed is slow due to lack of fast charging technology.

References 

Android (operating system) devices
Phablets
Mobile phones introduced in 2019
Tecno smartphones
Mobile phones with multiple rear cameras